Khatmal E Ishq is an Indian Comedy Show which was produced by Aswini Dheer under the banner of Garima Productions.
Khatmal E Ishq...Kaat Lega, the first series of the show premiered on 13 December 2016 on SAB TV. It starred Vishal Malhotra and Umang Jain. This first series ended on 20 January 2017.
Khatmal E Ishq - Biwi Ke Nakhre... Offo is the second series of the show which began airing from 23 January 2017. Third season named Khatmal E Ishq - Do Phool Ek Maali began airing on 8 March 2017.

Plot
Khatmal-E-Ishq is a romantic comedy narrating short stories of ageless love –The love which is beyond imagination & which can change your life forever. When this ishq ka khatmal bites, your life takes an unprecedented romantic turn. This light hearted comedy will introduce multiple lovable characters in multiple heart-warming situations.

Cast

Season 1: Khatmal E Ishq... Kaat Lega
Vishal Malhotra as Kapil Dev Dinkar
Umang Jain as Lovina D'Mello
Devender Chaudhary as Chacha Chaudhry 
Akhilendra Mishra as Dolphy D'Mello
Melissa Pais as Nancy D'Mello
Dhruv Singh as Nancy's husband 
Sulabha Arya as Loveena's grandmother
Sharat Saxena as Hanuman Singh Dinkar
Sanjay Mishra as Qawwal appearing in the title song

Season 2: Khatmal E Ishq... Biwi Ke Naakhre..Offo !! 
 Himanshu Soni as Shivam Kumar
 Nikita Sharma as Gauri Shivam Kumar
 Shekhar Shukla as Suresh Gupta, 1st Uncle
 Atul Parchure as Mahesh Gupta, 2nd Uncle
 Prasad Barve as Ramesh Gupta, 3rd Uncle
 Subhashis Chakraborty as Bhole, Servant

Season 3: Khatmal E Ishq... Do Phool Ek Maali 
 Karan Mehra as Sumit Mishra
 Aditi Tailang as Sugandha Mishra (née Sharma)
 Sandeep Sharma as Mohit
 Sheena Bajaj as Mehek (Dance Teacher)
 Mithilesh Chaturvedi as Boss
 Astha Agarwal as Biba

References

2016 Indian television series debuts
Hindi-language television shows
Indian drama television series
Sony SAB original programming
Indian television sitcoms